Ann Morrison Park is a  urban park along the Boise River in Boise, Idaho. The park is managed by the Boise Parks and Recreation Department and includes picnic facilities, bocce courts, a disc golf course, horseshoe pits, an outdoor gym, a volleyball court, a playground, tennis courts, and fields for softball, soccer, cricket, and football.

History
Ann Morrison Park was constructed in 1959 on land purchased from the Boise School District. Workers from the Morrison-Knudsen company built the park with funds provided by the Morrison Family Foundation, and the park is named in memory of Ann Daly Morrison, spouse of Morrison-Knudsen cofounder Harry W. Morrison.

See also

List of parks in Boise

References

External links

EM-Kayan magazine feature article, June 1959

Parks in Idaho
Boise, Idaho
1959 establishments in Idaho
Protected areas established in 1959